Ala'a Eldin Yousif (born January 3, 1982) is a Sudanese footballer who currently plays for the Sudanese club Al-Merrikh in the Sudanese Premier League.

He is a member of the Sudan National Football Team. 
He captained the national in the last four final qualifiers of the qualifying of the African zone. He was brought from El-Merreikh in December 2004 to the bitter rivals Al-Hilal. After playing for 7 years with Al-Hilal, he returned to Merreikh in July 2012.

International career

International goals
Scores and results list Sudan's goal tally first.

References

Living people
Sudanese footballers
Sudan international footballers
2011 African Nations Championship players
2012 Africa Cup of Nations players
1982 births
Al-Hilal Club (Omdurman) players
Al-Merrikh SC players
People from Khartoum North
Association football midfielders
Sudan A' international footballers